Too Late To Cancel is the third album by Mitch Benn, released in 2004 under the name of "Mitch Benn and The Distractions" with his backing band composed of Kirsty Newton (of Siskin) and Tasha Baylis (of Hepburn). All songs were written by Benn. Several had previous versions which had been in the radio shows The Now Show, It's Been a Bad Week and Mitch Benn's Crimes Against Music.

Track listing
"We Haven't Got A Clue" – 2:32
"Never Went Through A Smiths Phase" – 2:17
"Boy Band" – 3:13
"I Want" – 1:17
"Can't Do Disco" – 2:33
"Lonesome Führer" – 2:43
"Stinky Pants" – 2:14
"Now He's Gone" – 2:51
"Never Mind The Song (Look At The Stage Set)" – 3:22
"Tea Party" – 2:39
"One-Way System Blues" – 2:53
"Hard To Shock" – 3:07
"I'm Still Here" – 1:28
"West End Musical" – 3:48
"The Hardest Song In The World To Find" – 3:12
"Please Don't Release This Song" – 3:05
"The Interactive Song (Live)" – 2:58
"Macbeth (My Name Is) (Live)" – 4:48
"Baby I'm Sorry (Live)" – 3:19

Tracks 17-19 are bonus live tracks.

2004 albums
Mitch Benn albums
2000s comedy albums